The Danish resistance movements were an underground insurgency to resist the German occupation of Denmark during World War II. Due to the initially lenient arrangements, in which the Nazi occupation authority allowed the democratic government to stay in power, the resistance movement was slower to develop effective tactics on a wide scale than in some other countries.

Members of the Danish resistance movement were involved in underground activities, ranging from producing illegal publications to spying and sabotage. Major groups included the communist BOPA (Civil Partisans) and Holger Danske, both based in Copenhagen. Some small resistance groups such as the Samsing Group and the Churchill Club also contributed to the sabotage effort. Resistance agents killed an estimated 400 Danish Nazis, informers and collaborators until 1944. After that date, they also killed some German nationals.

In the postwar period, the Resistance was supported by politicians within Denmark and there was little effort to closely examine the killings. Studies in the late 20th and early 21st centuries revealed cases of improvised and contingent decision making about the targets, including morally ambiguous choices. Several important books and films have been produced on this topic.

Nonviolent resistance: 1940-1943

The "model protectorate"
During the invasion of Denmark on April 9, 1940 and subsequent occupation, the Danish king and government chose not to flee the country and instead collaborated with the German authorities who allowed the Danish government to remain in power. The Germans had reasons to do so, especially as they wanted to showcase Denmark as a "model protectorate", earning the nickname the Cream Front, due to the relative ease of the occupation and copious amount of dairy products. As the democratically elected Danish government remained in power, Danish citizens had less motivation to fight the occupation than in countries where the Germans established puppet governments, such as Norway or France. The police also remained under Danish authority and led by Danes.

Daily life in Denmark remained much the same as before the occupation. The Germans did make certain changes: imposing official censorship, prohibiting dealings with the Allies, and stationing German troops in the country. The Danish government actively discouraged violent resistance because it feared a severe backlash from the Germans against the civilian population.

Resistance groups
Immediately after the occupation began, isolated attempts were made to set up resistance and intelligence activities. Intelligence officers from the Danish army, known as the "Princes," began channeling reports to London allies as early as April 13, 1940. Soon afterwards, Ebbe Munck, a journalist from Berlingske Tidende, arranged to be transferred to Stockholm. From there he could more easily report to and communicate with the British.

Following the Nazi invasion of the Soviet Union on June 22, 1941 the Germans banned the Danish Communist Party and had the Danish police arrest its members. Those members who either avoided arrest or later escaped thus went underground and created resistance cells.  From October 1942, they published a clandestine newspaper, Land og Folk ("Land and People"), based on the previous Communist Party newspaper, Arbejderbladet, which was distributed widely across the country. Circulation grew to 120,000 copies per day by the end of the occupation. At the beginning of 1943, the cells were centrally coordinated under BOPA (Borgerlige Partisaner - Civil Partisans), which also began to plan acts of sabotage.

As time went on, many other insurgent groups formed to oppose the occupation. These included the Hvidsten group, which received weapons parachuted by the British, and Holger Danske, which was successful in organizing sabotage activities and the assassinations of collaborators. The Churchill club, one of the first resistance groups in Denmark, was a group of eight schoolboys from Aalborg. They performed some 25 acts of sabotage against the Germans, destroying Nazi German assets with makeshift grenades and stealing Nazi German weapons.

When the Germans forced the Danish government to sign the anti-Comintern pact, a large protest broke out in Copenhagen.

The number of Danish Nazis was low before the war, and this trend continued throughout the occupation. This was confirmed in the 1943 parliamentary elections, in which the population voted overwhelmingly for the four traditional parties, or abstained. The latter option was widely interpreted as votes for the Danish Communist Party. The election was a disappointment for the National Socialist Workers' Party of Denmark (DNSAP) and German Reichsbevollmächtigter. Dr. Werner Best abandoned plans to create a government under Danish Nazi leader Frits Clausen, due to Clausen's lack of public support.

In 1942-43, resistance operations gradually shifted to more violent action, most notably acts of sabotage. Various groups succeeded in making contacts with the British Special Operations Executive (SOE) which began making airdrops of agents and supplies. There were not many drops until August 1944, but they increased through the end of the occupation. In total throughout the war, over 600 ton of weapons, equipment and explosives were airdropped to the Danish resistance by the Allies, while 53 SOE agents were dispatched to Denmark.

Military intelligence operations
On 23 April 1940, members of Danish military intelligence established contacts with their British counterparts through the British diplomatic mission in Stockholm. The first intelligence dispatch was sent by messenger to the Stockholm mission in the autumn of 1940. This evolved into regular dispatches of military and political intelligence, and by 1942-43, the number of dispatches had increased to at least one per week. In addition, an employee of Danmarks Radio was able to transmit short messages to Britain through the national broadcasting network.

The intelligence was gathered mostly by officers in the Danish army and navy; they reported information about political developments, the location and size of German military units, and details about the Danish section of the Atlantic Wall fortifications. In 1942, the Germans demanded the removal of the Danish military from Jutland, but intelligence operations continued. It was carried out by plainclothes personnel or by reserve officers, since this group was not included in the evacuation order. Following the liberation of Denmark, Field Marshal Bernard Law Montgomery described the intelligence gathered in Denmark as "second to none".

Violent resistance: 1943-1945 

As the years went by, the number of acts of sabotage and violence grew. In 1943, the number grew dramatically, to the point that the German authorities became dissatisfied with the Danish authorities' handling of the situation. At the end of August, the Germans took over full administration in Denmark, which allowed them to deal with the population as they wished. The Germans raided every police station in Denmark, disarmed, arrested and deported all 2,000 Danish police officers to Germany. Policing became easier for the Nazis, but more and more people became involved with the movement because they were no longer worried about protecting the Danish government.

In particular, the Danish Freedom Council was set up in September 1943, bringing together the various resistance groups in order to improve their efficiency and resolve. An underground government was established. Allied governments, who had been skeptical about Denmark's commitment to fight Germany, began recognising it as a full ally.

Due to concerns about prisoners and information held in Gestapo headquarters at the Shellhus in the centre of Copenhagen, the resistance repeatedly requested a tactical RAF raid on the headquarters to destroy records and release prisoners. Britain initially turned down the request due to the risk of civilian casualties, but eventually launched Operation Carthage, a very low-level raid by 20 de Havilland Mosquito fighter-bombers, escorted by 30 P-51 Mustang fighters.  The raid succeeded in destroying the headquarters, releasing 18 prisoners of the Gestapo, and disrupting anti-resistance operations throughout Denmark. However, 125 civilians lost their lives due to the errant bombing of a nearby boarding school.

Actions 

In 1943, the movement scored a great success in rescuing all but 500 of Denmark's Jewish population of 7,000-8,000 from being sent to the Nazi concentration camps by helping transport them to neutral Sweden, where they were offered asylum. The Danish resistance movement has been honoured as a collective at Yad Vashem in Israel as being part of the "Righteous Among the Nations". They were honoured as a collective rather than as individuals at their own request.

Another success was the disruption of the Danish railway network in the days after D-Day, which delayed the movement of German troops to France as reinforcements.

By the end of the war, the organized resistance movement in Denmark had scored many successes. It is believed to have killed nearly 400 persons (the top official number is 385) from 1943 through 1945, who were Danish Nazis, informers or collaborators thought to pose a threat to the Resistance, or Danes working for the Gestapo. The rationale behind the executions was discussed, and several accounts by participants said a committee identified targets, but no historic evidence of this system has been found. In the postwar period, while the killings were criticized, they were also defended by such politicians as Frode Jakobsen and Per Federspiel.

The movement lost slightly more than 850 members, in action, in prison, in Nazi concentration camps, or (in the case of 102 resistance members) executed following a court-martial.

The Danish National Museum maintains the Museum of Danish Resistance in Copenhagen.

Since the late 20th century, there has been more discussion about the morality of some of the killings carried out by the resistance, sparked by a TV series about the death of  Jane Horney, a Danish citizen killed at sea in what Frode Jakobsen defended as an act of war.

With the 60th anniversary of the end of the war, the issue was re-examined in two new studies: Stefan Emkjar's Stikkerdrab and Peter Ovig Knudsen's Etter drabet, "the first profound approaches into the topic." Both authors used veterans of the resistance movement, and covered the sometimes contingent, improvised nature of some of the actions. It suggested that some of the noted Bent Faurschou-Hviid (Flammen)'s executions may have been mistakenly directed by a double agent.  Knudsen's work was adapted as a 2-hour documentary film, With the Right to Kill (2003), which was shown on TV and later released in theaters. These works have contributed to a national discussion on the topic. Flame and Citron (Flammen og Citronen, 2008) is a fictionalized drama film based on historic accounts of the two prominent Danish resistance fighters, directed by Ole Christian Madsen. It portrays some of the moral ambiguity of their actions.

Prominent members 

 Christer Lyst Hansen
 Henning Bysted
 Mogens Fog
 Flemming Muus
 Monica Wichfeld
 Varinka Wichfeld-Muus
 Niels Eberhard Petersen
 Ove Kampmann
 Anton Poul Andersen
 Poul Kristian Brandt Rehberg
 Poul Bruun
 Marius Fiil
 Niels Fiil
 Jørgen Kieler
 Thomas Sneum
 Jørgen Haagen Schmith (Citronen)
 Bent Faurschou-Hviid (Flammen)
 John Christmas Møller
 Ole Lippmann
 Børge Bak
 Tom Dencker-Grant

 Jørgen Strange Lorenzen
 Sven Fage-Pedersen
 Poul Nielsen
 Find Sandgren
 David John Valdemar Schultz (1923-2014)
 Kim Malthe-Bruun
 Knud Pedersen
 Povl Falk-Jensen
 Preben Munch-Nielsen
 Lone Maslocha
 Ellen Christensen
 Hans Edvard Teglers

Strategic result
The extent to which the Danish resistance played an important strategic role in the war has been the subject of much discussion. Immediately after the war and until about 1970, the vast majority of accounts overrated the degree to which the resistance had been effective in battling against the Germans by acts of sabotage and by providing key intelligence to the Allies. More recently, however, after re-examining the archives, historians concur that, while the resistance provided a firm basis for moral support and paved the way for post-war governments, the strategic effect during the occupation was limited. The Germans did not need to send reinforcements to suppress the movement, and garrisoned the country with a comparatively small number of Wehrmacht troops. The resistance did not enter into active combat. Even the overall importance of Danish intelligence in the context of Ultra is questionable.

In his history, No Small Achievement: Special Operations Executive and the Danish Resistance 1940-1945 (2002), Knud Jespersen examined the relationship between British Intelligence and the Danish Resistance. He quoted a report from SHAEF stating that the resistance in Denmark. 
"caused strain and embarrassment to the enemy...[and a] striking reduction in the flow of troops and stores from Norway [that] undoubtedly had an adverse effect on the reinforcements for the battles East and West of the Rhine."Examining the British archives, Jespersen also found a report concluding "that the overall effect of Danish resistance was to restore national pride and political unity." He agreed that this was the movement's most important contribution to the nation.

Representation in other media

Books
 Carol Matas's 1987 and 1989 novels Lisa and Jesper presented fictionalized accounts of Danish resistance missions.
 Ken Follett's 2002 suspense novel Hornet Flight presents a fictionalized account of early Danish resistance.
 Stefan Emkjar's Stikkerdrab (Killing of Informers: The Resistance Movements' Liquidation of Danes during the Occupation, 2000) and Peter Øvig Knudsen's Etter drabet (Following the Death: Reports of the Resistance Liquidations, 2001), were both non-fiction studies of the resistance, published before the 60th anniversary of the end of the war. 
 Number the Stars (1989), children's historical fiction novel by Lois Lowry, won the Newbery Medal.
 Barry Clemson's alternative history novel, Denmark Rising (2009), imagines a Denmark that implemented a total resistance to the Nazis via strategic nonviolence.
 Povl Falk-Jensen's Holger Danske - Afdeling Eigils sabotager og stikkerlikvideringer under Besættelsen (2010), Danish resistance member Povl Falk-Jensen's memoir. Povl Falk-Jensen was a leading member of the Danish resistance group Holger Danske during World War II and responsible for eleven executions of informers or collaborators.
 H. George Frederickson's 1997 text The Spirit of Public Administration compares the response of the bureaucracy in Denmark to other European nations to the rise of the Nazi party and Adolf Hitler.
 Aage Bertelsen's "October '43" (1954) An autobiographical account of the Jewish escape to Sweden in 1943, written by a prominent member of the Danish resistance. Originally written in Danish, but translated into other languages. Author not to be confused with famous Danish painter Aage Bertelsen.

Film
  The Twentieth Century with Walter Cronkite: episode Sabotage. CBS approximately 1960. Black and white.
 Flame and Citron (Flammen og Citronen) (2008) is a drama film based on two prominent Danish resistance fighters,; it is directed by Ole Christian Madsen.
 Miracle at Midnight (1998), American made-for-TV movie about the rescue of the Jews in Denmark, starring Sam Waterston and Mia Farrow, featuring neighbors helping a family escape to Sweden.
 The Boys from St. Petri, a 1991 Danish drama film.
 The Only Way, A 1970 war drama film about the rescue of the Danish Jews starring Jane Seymour.
 This Life (Hvidstengruppen) (2012) is a Danish drama film based on the activities of the Hvidsten Group.
 With the Right to Kill (Med ret til at dræbe, 2003), is a documentary adapted from the 2001 book by journalist Peter Øvig Knudsen and directed by Morten Henriksen; it explores the liquidation of nearly 400 people by the Resistance during World War II from 1943 through 1945. It won a Robert Award in 2004 for best full-length documentary.
 Omvej til friheden (Detour to freedom), a made-for-TV documentary movie about two Jewish families attempting to flee to neutral Sweden and featuring actual Jewish survivors and members of the Danish resistance.
 Land of Mine, a 2015 Danish film nominated for Oscar for Best Foreign Film, about young German POWs clearing Nazi beach mines.  Director: Martin Zandvliet from IMDB.
 Netflix holds distribution rights to a Danish movie The Bombardment, which was first released in October 2021 in Denmark. The film is also known The Shadow in My Eye (Skyggen i mit øje in Danish) and Netflix released the movie in March 2022.

Music
 "Denmark 1943", a song by Fred Small on his album I Will Stand Fast

References

Further reading
 Ackerman, Peter and Jack DuVall. A Force More Powerful. New York: Palgrave, 2000. 
 Hæestrup, Jørgen. Secret Alliance - A Study of the Danish Resistance Movement 1940-45. Vols I, II & III. Odense University Press, 1976-77. ,  & .
 Jespersen, Knud J. V. No Small Achievement: Special Operations Executive and the Danish Resistance 1940-1945. Odense,  University Press of Southern Denmark. 
 Lampe, David (1957). The Danish Resistance. New York: Ballantine Books.
 Moore, Bob (editor). Resistance in Western Europe (esp. Chapter on Denmark by Hans Kirchoff), Oxford : Berg, 2000, .
 Besættelsens Hvem Hvad Hvor (Who What Where of the Occupation), Copenhagen, Politikens Forlag, 3rd revised edition, 1985. .
 Reilly, Robin. Sixth Floor: The Danish Resistance Movement and the RAF Raid on Gestapo Headquarters March 1, 2002.
 Stenton, Michael. Radio London and Resistance in Occupied Europe, Oxford University Press. 2000. 
 Voorhis, Jerry. "Germany and Denmark: 1940-45", Scandinavian Studies 44:2, 1972.
 Zimmerman, Susan, Prisoner of the Gestapo: Freed by Words, Warfare History Network, 20 March 2019

External links
 Danish resistance movement – description of its activity to save Jews' lives at the Holocaust, at Yad Vashem website

 
World War II resistance movements
Articles containing video clips